Pretenders was a 13 episode British historical adventure television series produced by Harlech Television (HTV) and broadcast from 27 February to 21 May 1972 on ITV. It was filmed in Somerset, England and Wales.

The series takes place in 1685 and is set against the backdrop of the Monmouth Rebellion against the Catholic King James II of England. It starred Frederick Jaeger as Joachim, a German mercenary who assists Elam (Curtis Arden), a 13-year-old boy who believes that he is the illegitimate son of the Duke of Monmouth, who in turn is the illegitimate son of James II's Protestant elder brother Charles II of England and therefore claims to be the rightful heir to the throne. The series followed their various adventures, leading up to the climactic Battle of Sedgemoor, the last pitched battle on English soil.

Cast
Frederick Jaeger as Joachim
Elizabeth Robillard as Perfect
Curtis Arden as Elam

External links

1972 British television series debuts
1972 British television series endings
1970s British drama television series
ITV television dramas
1970s British television miniseries
Television series by ITV Studios
Television shows produced by Harlech Television (HTV)
English-language television shows
Television shows set in England
Television series set in the 17th century